James Brabazon Grimston, 5th Earl of Verulam (11 October 1910 – 13 October 1960) was a British peer and businessman.

Verulam was the eldest son of James Grimston, 4th Earl of Verulam, and Lady Violet Brabazon, younger daughter of the 12th Earl of Meath. He was educated at Eton and Christ Church, Oxford. His first job was in Austria after which he was managing director of Enfield Zinc Products. In 1949 he became chairman of Enfield Rolling Mills.

He was mayor of St Albans in 1956; and president of the Cremation Society from  1955 to 1958. He was also a director of the District Bank and sat on various committees concerned with health, welfare and disability.

He was succeeded in titles by his younger brother, John Grimston.

Jim Forrester and work in Brynmawr

At the age of 19, whilst studying at Oxford, James first went to Brynmawr on an international work camp.

Brynmawr had suffered from high unemployment due to the closure of local coal mines in the 1920s, and a Quaker initiative known as the Brynmawr Experiment had been set up to help find unemployed local people a livelihood.

In 1934, Peter Scott, previously the instigator of the Quaker work in Brynmawr, decided to set up a Subsistence Production Society (SPS) in the area, and James was appointed as the Area Organiser, where he was known as Jim Forrester, the surname being derived from his family courtesy title Lord Forrester.

The SPS consisted of farms, a bakery and other facilities where members could obtain food and products they wanted in return for work. In 1939, due to preparations for war providing work for local unemployed people, the SPS collapsed.

After the end of the Second World War, James continued to try to work in Brynmawr by establishing a model rubber factory.

References

1910 births
1960 deaths
5
James
20th-century British businesspeople
People educated at Eton College
Alumni of Christ Church, Oxford
Mayors of St Albans